Prison Officer David Black was killed on 1 November 2012 by the New IRA. He was the first prison officer to be killed by Republicans since the Good Friday Agreement.

Attack
Black was driving to work in Maghaberry Prison when he was shot by the New IRA at 7:30 am. He was on the motorway between Portadown and Lurgan, when a car with Dublin registration plates drove up beside him and fired shots at him, and he veered into a ditch.

Reaction
Prime Minister of the United Kingdom David Cameron: "First and foremost this is a dreadful tragedy for the family and friends of David Black who has been so brutally murdered as he went about his work keeping the people of Northern Ireland safe. My heart goes out to them."
PSNI Chief Constable Matt Baggott: "It is a completely senseless attack which demonstrates the ruthlessness and recklessness of those opposed to peace and who live for violence."
Taniste Eamon Gilmore: "I know that I speak for every decent man, woman and child on this island, north and south, in expressing revulsion at this act. There will be no return to the dark and violent days of the past. The tragic loss of life that we have seen this morning serves only to bring us together in a shared grief and a shared determination to work together in building a better future for all.

Aftermath
The trial of a man charged with aiding and abetting Black's murder collapsed in 2018.

In November 2022, on the tenth anniversary of the murder, Black's widow made a fresh appeal for information on her husband's killers.

References

2012 in Northern Ireland
2012 murders in the United Kingdom
Attacks by Republicans since the Good Friday Agreement
Deaths by firearm in Northern Ireland
November 2012 crimes
November 2012 events in the United Kingdom
Terrorist incidents in the United Kingdom in 2012
2012 crimes in Ireland
Deaths by person in Northern Ireland
2010s murders in Northern Ireland